Be'erotayim is a moshav in central Israel. Located in the Sharon plain and covering 3,500 dunams, it falls under the jurisdiction of Hefer Valley Regional Council. Be'erotayim is a member of the Moshavim Movement.

Etymology
The name (meaning "Two Wells") is derived from the pre-1948 Arabic name "Bir Burin".

History
The moshav was founded in 1949 by Jewish immigrants from Czechoslovakia and Hungary. In 1956, it absorbed more Jewish immigrants from North Africa. Every family was allotted 25 dunam of land: 10 dunam for growing vegetables and 15 dunam for orchards. A water shortage caused hardships in the moshav in its first years of operation.

Nearby Olesh was initially named Be'erotayim Bet, but was later renamed.

References

Czech-Jewish culture in Israel
Hungarian-Jewish culture in Israel
North African-Jewish culture in Israel
Slovak-Jewish culture in Israel
Moshavim
Populated places established in 1949
Populated places in Central District (Israel)
1949 establishments in Israel